Kavousi is a historic village in the municipality of Ierapetra in the prefecture of Lasithi in eastern Crete. "Kavousi" in the Cretan dialect means "water source" (Greek: Πηγή). The village is situated 19 km (11.8 mi) northeast of Ierapetra, 26 km (16 mi) east of Agios Nikolaos and 42 km (26 mi) west of Sitia. The village is located in the northern foothills of the  Thripti mountain range at an elevation of 140 meters above sea level. Many archaeological sites have been discovered in the area of Kavousi, among which are Vronda, Kastro, Azoria, Chrysokamino and the isle Pseira. Kavousi lies just 3.6 km (2.2 mi) south of Tholos Beach. The village has views over the Gulf of Mirabello and the Isthmus of Ierapetra.

Population history

References

Further reading
 Boyd, Harriet A. (1901), 'Excavations at Kavousi, Crete, in 1900', American Journal of Archaeology, Vol. 5, No. 2. (Apr. - Jun., 1901), pp. 125-157.
 Gesell, Geraldine C., Leslie P. Day, and William D.E. Coulson (1983), 'Excavations and Survey at Kavousi, 1978-1981', Hesperia Vol. 52, No. 4 (Oct. 1983), pp. 389-420.
 Gesell, Geraldine C., Leslie P. Day, and William D.E. Coulson (1985), 'Kavousi, 1982-83: The Kastro', Hesperia Vol. 54, No. 4 (Oct. 1985), pp. 327-355.
 Day, Leslie P., William D.E. Coulson, and Geraldine C. Gesell, 'Kavousi 1983-84: The Settlement at Vronda',  Hesperia Vol. 55, No. 4 (Oct. 1986), pp. 335-387.
 Gesell, Geraldine C., Leslie P. Day, and William D.E. Coulson, 'Excavations at Kavousi, Crete, 1987', Hesperia Vol. 57, No. 4 (Oct. 1988), pp.  279-301.  
 Gesell, Geraldine C., William D.E. Coulson, and Leslie P. Day (1991), 'Excavations at Kavousi, Crete, 1988', Hesperia Vol. 60, No. 2 (Apr. 1991), pp. 145-177.
 Gesell, Geraldine C., Leslie P. Day, and William D.E. Coulson (1995), 'Excavations at Kavousi, Crete, 1989 and 1990', Hesperia Vol. 64, No. 1 (Jan. 1995), pp. 67-120.
 Haggis, Donald C. (1996), 'Archaeological Survey at Kavousi, East Crete: Preliminary Report', Hesperia, Vol. 65, No. 4. (Oct. - Dec., 1996), pp. 373-432.
 Coulson, William D.E., Donald C. Haggis, Margaret S. Mook, and Jennifer L. Tobin (1997), 'Excavations on the Kastro at Kavousi: An Architectural Overview', Hesperia Vol. 66, No. 3 (Jul. 1997), pp. 315-390.
 Betancourt, Philip P., James D. Muhly, William R. Farrand, Carola Stearns, Lada Onyshkevych, William B. Hafford, and Doniert Evely (1999), 'Research and Excavation at Chrysokamino, Crete 1995-1998', Hesperia Vol. 68, No. 3 (Jul. - Sep. 1999), pp. 343-370.
Morris, Michael W. (2002), Soil Science and Archaeology: Three Test Cases from Minoan Crete (Prehistory Monographs 4), Philadelphia, PA: INSTAP Academic Press, 2002.
Haggis, Donald C., Margaret S. Mook, C. Margaret Scarry, Lynn M. Snyder and William C. West III (2004), 'Excavations at Azoria, 2002,' Hesperia, Vol. 73, No. 3 (Jul. - Sep., 2004), pp. 339-400.
Haggis, Donald C. (2005), Kavousi I: The Archaeological Survey of the Kavousi Region (Prehistory Monographs 16), Philadelphia, PA: INSTAP Academic Press, 2005.
Betancourt, Philip P. (2006), The Chrysokamino Metallurgy Workshop and Its Territory (Hesperia Supplement 36), Princeton, NJ: ASCSA Publications, 2006.
Stefanakis, Manolis I., William C. West, III, Donald C. Haggis, Margaret S. Mook, Rodney D. Fitzsimons, C. Margaret Scarry and Lynn M. Snyder (2007), 'Excavations at Azoria, 2003-2004, Part 1: The Archaic Civic Complex,' Hesperia, Vol. 76, No. 2 (Apr. - Jun., 2007), pp. 243-321.
Haggis, Donald C., Margaret S. Mook, Tristan Carter and Lynn M. Snyder (2007), 'Excavations at Azoria, 2003-2004, Part 2: The Final Neolithic, Late Prepalatial, and Early Iron Age Occupation,' Hesperia, Vol. 76, No. 4 (Oct. - Dec., 2007), pp. 665-716.
Day, Leslie P., Nancy L. Klein, and Lee Ann Turner (2009), Kavousi IIA: The Late Minoan IIIC Settlement at Vronda. The Buildings on the Periphery (Prehistory Monographs 39), Philadelphia, PA: INSTAP Academic Press, 2009.
Small, David B. (2010), "The Archaic Polis of Azoria: A Window into Cretan 'Political' Social Structure," Journal of Mediterranean Archaeology 23.2, pp. 197-217.
 Haggis, Donald C., Margaret S. Mook, Rodney D. Fitzsimons, C. Margaret Scarry, Lynn M. Snyder, and William C. West III (2011), 'Excavation in the Archaic Civic Buildings at Azoria in 2005-2006', Hesperia Vol. 80, No. 1 (January-March 2011), pp. 1-70.
 Haggis, Donald C., Margaret S. Mook, Rodney D. Fitzsimons, C. Margaret Scarry, and Lynn M. Snyder (2011), ‘The Excavation of Archaic Houses at Azoria in 2005-2006', Hesperia Vol. 80, No. 3 (July-September 2011), pp. 431–489.
Day, Leslie P., and Kevin T. Glowacki (2012), Kavousi IIB: The Late Minoan IIIC Settlement at Vronda. The Buildings on the Summit (Prehistory Monographs 26), Philadelphia, PA: INSTAP Academic Press, 2012.

External links

Ierapetra
Populated places in Lasithi